Clarksburg is a city in Moniteau County, Missouri, United States. The population was 334 at the 2010 census. It is part of the Jefferson City, Missouri Metropolitan Statistical Area.

History
A post office called Clarksburg has been in operation since 1884. Hiram Clark, an early postmaster, gave the town his last name.

Geography
Clarksburg is located at  (38.659954, -92.667454).

Demographics

2010 census
As of the census of 2010, there were 334 people, 115 households, and 89 families residing in the city. The racial makeup of the city was 97.9% White, 0.6% Native American, 0.6% from other races, and 0.9% from two or more races. Hispanic or Latino of any race were 1.8% of the population.

There were 115 households, of which 48.7% had children under the age of 18 living with them, 44.3% were married couples living together, 21.7% had a female householder with no husband present, 11.3% had a male householder with no wife present, and 22.6% were non-families. 15.7% of all households were made up of individuals, and 4.3% had someone living alone who was 65 years of age or older. The average household size was 2.90 and the average family size was 3.16.

The median age in the city was 31.7 years. 34.1% of residents were under the age of 18; 6.4% were between the ages of 18 and 24; 30.6% were from 25 to 44; 21.3% were from 45 to 64; and 7.8% were 65 years of age or older. The gender makeup of the city was 49.1% male and 50.9% female.

2000 census
As of the census of 2000, there were 375 people, 129 households, and 81 families residing in the city. The population density was 649.9 people per square mile (249.6/km2). There were 157 housing units at an average density of 272.1 per square mile (104.5/km2). The racial makeup of the city was 100.00% White. Hispanic or Latino of any race were 4.27% of the population.

There were 129 households, out of which 41.1% had children under the age of 18 living with them, 45.0% were married couples living together, 14.0% had a female householder with no husband present, and 37.2% were non-families. 33.3% of all households were made up of individuals, and 13.2% had someone living alone who was 65 years of age or older. The average household size was 2.91 and the average family size was 3.78.

In the city the population was spread out, with 38.9% under the age of 18, 7.5% from 18 to 24, 30.1% from 25 to 44, 14.1% from 45 to 64, and 9.3% who were 65 years of age or older. The median age was 27 years. For every 100 females, there were 101.6 males. For every 100 females age 18 and over, there were 87.7 males.

The median income for a household in the city was $28,750, and the median income for a family was $37,292. Males had a median income of $25,000 versus $17,500 for females. The per capita income for the city was $11,903. About 3.8% of families and 8.3% of the population were below the poverty line, including 10.5% of those under age 18 and none of those age 65 or over.

References

External links
 Historic maps of Clarksburg in the Sanborn Maps of Missouri Collection at the University of Missouri

Cities in Moniteau County, Missouri
Jefferson City metropolitan area
Cities in Missouri
1884 establishments in Missouri